Brandon Fields (born 1958) is a saxophonist, flutist, and clarinetist from Indiana.

He has recorded with Alex Acuña, David Benoit, Stanley Clarke, Harry Connick Jr., Luis Conte, Terence Trent D'Arby, Neil Diamond, George Duke, David Garfield, Robben Ford, Al Jarreau, Elton John, Quincy Jones, Los Lobotomys (Steve Lukather, Simon Phillips & co), Neil Larsen, Michael McDonald, Bill Meyers, Alphonse Mouzon, Ricky Peterson, Tom Petty, Lionel Richie, The Rippingtons, Tower of Power, Luther Vandross, Dave Weckl, Nancy Wilson and Phil Upchurch. He recorded also with Ray Charles, appearing on the posthumously-released album Genius Loves Company (2004).

Brandon has also played on the movie soundtracks for Bull Durham (1988), Class Action (1991), Waiting to Exhale (1995), 2 Days in the Valley (1996), The Preacher's Wife (1996), and Austin Powers: The Spy Who Shagged Me (1999).

Brandon has toured with  George Benson (1985–86), The Rippingtons (1987–89 as a member), Tower of Power (early 1990s as a member), Earth Wind and Fire (1995), and with the Dave Weckl Band (1998–present).

Discography 
 The Other Side of the Story (Nova, 1986)
 The L.A. Jazz Quintet (ProJazz, 1986)
 The Traveler (Nova, 1988)
 Other Places (Nova, 1990)
 Everybody's Business (Nova, 1991)
 Brandon Fields (Positive Music, 1995)
 Fields & Strings (Paras, 1999)
 One People (CD baby, 2009)

References

External links 
 Official website www.BrandonFields.com

Living people
American jazz saxophonists
American male saxophonists
American male jazz musicians
Tower of Power members
The Rippingtons members
21st-century American saxophonists
21st-century American male musicians
Chris Walden Big Band members
1958 births